(On Christ's ascension into heaven alone), is a church cantata by Johann Sebastian Bach. Bach composed it in Leipzig for the Feast of the Ascension and first performed it on 10 May 1725.

History and words 

Bach composed the cantata in his second year in Leipzig for the feast of the Ascension. The prescribed readings for the feast day were from the Acts of the Apostles, Jesus telling his disciples to preach and baptize, and his Ascension, and from the Gospel of Mark. In his second year in Leipzig, Bach had composed chorale cantatas between the first Sunday after Trinity and Palm Sunday, but for Easter returned to cantatas on more varied texts, possibly because he lost his librettist. Nine of his cantatas for the period between Easter and Pentecost are based on texts of Christiana Mariana von Ziegler, including this cantata.

In movement 2 she alludes to the Transfiguration of Jesus, movement 3 sees the incomprehensible power of Jesus everywhere, not restricted to a certain location.

Ziegler's text in its printed version of 1728 and the cantata text differ, possibly changed by Bach himself. For example, an aria and recitative are combined to one movement by inserting "" (where my redeemer lives) as a connection.

Bach first performed the cantata on 10 May 1725.

Scoring and structure 
The cantata in five movements is festively scored for three vocal soloists, alto, tenor and bass, a four-part choir, two horns, two oboes, oboe d'amore, oboe da caccia, two violins, viola and basso continuo.  The instrumentation is especially rich and varied, Julian Mincham observes: "As befits its importance, the instrumental forces are relatively large and impressive; two horns, oboes of every kind, strings and continuo and latterly one trumpet".

 Chorus: 
 Recitative (tenor): 
 Aria and recitative (bass): 
 Aria (alto, tenor): 
 Chorale:

Music 

In the opening chorus the chorale on the melody of the German Gloria "" by Nikolaus Decius is embedded in an orchestral concerto. The cantus firmus is in the soprano in long notes, whereas the lower voices engage in imitation. Bach derived the highly figurative motifs of the instruments from the chorale tune: both a signal played first by the strings and oboes, then the two horns, then a fugue subject. Both motifs contain notes from the first line of the tune in the same order as in the tune, the signal contains the first five notes, the fugue subject all nine notes.

Bach uses the trumpet, the royal instrument of the Baroque, only in movement 3 to symbolize the reign of Jesus. The trumpet appears first in the ritornello, which is repeated by the voice and again with the voice embedded. After a middle section, the first part of the aria is not repeated da capo; instead the added line is set as a recitative accompanied by strings, followed only by a repeat of the ritornello.

The following duet is of intimate character. The obbligato instrument is marked "organo" in the score, but the music is written in the oboe part and appears to have been composed for an oboe d'amore. Possibly Bach changed his intentions during the process of composition, or he may have changed the marking later. Max Reger used the movement's ritornello theme for his Bach-Variationen Op. 81.

The cantata is closed by a four-part chorale, most instruments playing colla parte, while the horns play different parts because of their limited range.

Recordings 
 Bach Made in Germany Vol. 1 – Cantatas V, Günther Ramin, Thomanerchor, Gewandhausorchester,  Lotte Wolf-Matthäus, Gert Lutze, Johannes Oettel, Eterna 1953
 Bach: 13 Sacred Cantatas & 13 Sinfonias, Helmut Winschermann, Kantorei Barmen-Gemarke, Deutsche Bachsolisten, Julia Hamari, Kurt Equiluz, Hermann Prey, Philips 1971
 Die Bach Kantate Vol. 35, Helmuth Rilling, Gächinger Kantorei, Bach-Collegium Stuttgart, Gabriele Schreckenbach, Aldo Baldin, Wolfgang Schöne, Hänssler 1981
 J. S. Bach: Das Kantatenwerk – Sacred Cantatas Vol. 7, Gustav Leonhardt, Knabenchor Hannover, Collegium Vocale Gent, Leonhardt-Consort, René Jacobs, Kurt Equiluz, Max van Egmond, Teldec 1983
 J. S. Bach: Ascension Cantatas, John Eliot Gardiner, Monteverdi Choir, English Baroque Soloists, Robin Blaze, Christoph Genz, Reinhard Hagen, Archiv Produktion 1993
 Bach Edition Vol. 12 – Cantatas Vol. 6, Pieter Jan Leusink, Holland Boys Choir, Netherlands Bach Collegium, Sytse Buwalda, Nico van der Meel, Bas Ramselaar, Brilliant Classics 1999
 J. S. Bach: Complete Cantatas Vol. 15, Ton Koopman, Amsterdam Baroque Orchestra & Choir, Bogna Bartosz, Jörg Dürmüller, Klaus Mertens, Antoine Marchand 2001
 J. S. Bach: Cantatas Vol. 35 (Cantatas from Leipzig 1725), Masaaki Suzuki, Bach Collegium Japan, Robin Blaze, Makoto Sakurada, Peter Kooy, BIS 2001

Notes

References

Sources 
 
 Auf Christi Himmelfahrt allein BWV 128; BC A 76 / Sacred cantata (Ascension Day) Bach Digital
 Cantata BWV 128 Auf Christi Himmelfahrt allein: history, scoring, sources for text and music, translations to various languages, discography, discussion, Bach Cantatas Website
 BWV 128 Auf Christi Himmelfahrt allein: English translation, University of Vermont
 BWV 128 Auf Christi Himmelfahrt allein: text, scoring, University of Alberta
 Luke Dahn: BWV 128.5 bach-chorales.com

Church cantatas by Johann Sebastian Bach
1725 compositions
Ascension of Jesus